Jalan Chenderiang (Perak state route A119) is a major road in Perak, Malaysia.

List of junctions

Chenderiang